Trainer may refer to:

Entertainment
Trainer (album), an album released by Plaid in 2000
Trainer (TV series), a British TV series
The Trainer, a 2009 British play written by David Wilson and Anne Aylor
Trainer!, a 2013 German documentary by Aljoscha Pause
Trainer (film), transliteration of Coach, a 2018 Russian film by Danila Kozlovsky

Equipment and technology
 Trainer (bicycling), a device that attaches to a bicycle and makes it stationary for indoor training
 Trainer (aircraft), an aircraft used for training pilots
 Trainer (footwear), an athletic shoe, in British and Hong Kong English
 Trainer (games), software for computer and video games that adds in extra options, usually to make the game easier
 Arc Trainer, a stationary, non-impact exercise machine
 Goair Trainer, an Australian monoplane
 Holdfast Trainer, a South Australian sailing dinghy
 Marendaz Trainer, a two-seat low-wing training aircraft
 Radlock Trainer, a single seat primary glider

Places 
Trainer, Pennsylvania, United States
Trainer, West Virginia, United States
Trainer Glacier, a glacier in Victoria Land, Antarctica
Trainer Hills, a mountain range in California, United States
Treene (disambiguation), a river and municipality in Schleswig-Holstein in Germany

Professions 
 Animal training, a person who trains animals for obedience, tricks, and work
 Athletic trainer, a certified and licensed health care professional who practices in the field of sports medicine
 Horse trainer, a person responsible for preparing a horse for horse racing
 Personal trainer, a person who guides another person in developing physical fitness
 Trainer (business), or facilitator, a person who educates employees of companies on specific topics of workplace importance

Other uses
 Trainer card, a Pokémon trading card
 Trainer (surname)

See also
 
 Trainor (disambiguation)
 Traynor (disambiguation)
 Coach (disambiguation)